Kollel Chazon Ish is a kollel (group of married Jewish men who study Torah) of rabbis on HaAri St 3, in Bnei Brak, Israel with a focus on Talmud study.

The Kollel was originally established by Rabbi Avrohom Yeshaya Karelitz, who was known as the Chazon Ish. Rabbi Yaakov Yisrael Kanievsky, his brother-in-law, taught there.

Notable members 

 Rabbi Yechezkel Brettler
 Rabbi Aharon Feldman
 Rabbi Chaim Kanievsky
 Rabbi Nissim Karelitz
 Rabbi Yaakov Kohn
 Rabbi Gedaliah Nadel
 Rabbi Moshe Shmuel Shapiro
 Rabbi Yehuda Shapiro (Yudel Shapiro)
 Rabbi Dovid Shmidel
 Rabbi Aaron Teitelbaum
 Rabbi Yisroel Eliyahu Weintraub
 Rabbi Yechezkel Moskovitz

References

Orthodox yeshivas in Bnei Brak
Kollelim